Coming Soon is a 1999 American romantic comedy film directed by Colette Burson and written by Burson and Kate Robin. Starring Bonnie Root, Gaby Hoffmann, Tricia Vessey and Ryan Reynolds, it has been described as a female-centric American Pie.

Plot
Three wealthy, savvy high school seniors have everything: brains, beauty, money, popularity, powerful parents, and boyfriends. Stream Hodsell is a smart, down-to-earth strawberry blonde. Sassy Jenny Simon masks her intelligence behind a guise of fishnet stockings. Nell Kellner is a soulful. The girls attend the prestigious and expensive Halton School in Manhattan. Among their boyfriends are Chad and garage band musician Henry Lipschitz. 

The trio, however, still feel unfulfilled. After losing her virginity without obtaining sexual satisfaction, Stream is confused as well as unfulfilled and studies the problem with self-help books, women's magazines and the comically misinformed advice of her peers. Judy Hodsell is Stream's distracted ex-hippie mom, Dick Hodsell is her yuppie father with a new young girlfriend, Mimi, and Mr. Jennings is a feel-good career counselor.

Cast
Bonnie Root as Stream Hodsell
Gaby Hoffmann as Jenny Simon
Tricia Vessey as Nell Kellner
Ryan Reynolds as Henry Rockefeller Lipschitz
Yasmine Bleeth as Mimi
Mia Farrow as Judy Hodsell
Ryan O'Neal as Dick
James Roday Rodriguez as Chad
Spalding Gray as Mr. Jennings
Peter Bogdanovich as Bartholomew
Bridget Barkan as Polly
Ramsey Faragallah as Wahid
Ashton Kutcher as Louie
James McCaffrey as Dante
Victor Argo as Mr. Neipris
Tim Cunningham as Dr. Frank

Reception
The film received mixed to negative reviews from critics. On review aggregator website Rotten Tomatoes, it has a 38% score based on 8 reviews, with an average rating of 4.5/10. Metacritic reports a 44 out of 100 rating based on 7 reviews, indicating "mixed or average reviews".

References

External links

1999 films
1990s English-language films
1999 romantic comedy films
American romantic comedy films
American sex comedy films
American teen comedy films
Films scored by Christophe Beck
Films produced by Beau Flynn
Films shot in New York City
1990s sex comedy films
1990s American films